Golec may refer to:
 Golec, Warmian-Masurian Voivodeship, village in Poland
 Goleč, islet in Croatia

 Golec uOrkiestra, Polish folk-rock group

 Antony Golec (born 1990),  Australian footballer
 Vedran Golec (born 1989), Croatian taekwondo practitioner